Tommy Makinson (born 10 October 1991) is an English professional rugby league footballer who plays as a er for St Helens in the Betfred Super League and England at international level.

He spent time on loan from St Helens at the Rochdale Hornets in Championship 1 and Whitehaven in the Championship.

Makinson has played his entire Super League career to date for Saints, with whom he won the 2014, 2019, 2020, 2021 and the 2022 Super League Grand Finals.

Background
Makinson was born in Ince-in-Makerfield, Wigan, Greater Manchester, England.

Career
Makinson signed for the St Helens club from Wigan amateur side Wigan St Judes, after previously playing for Hindley before playing for Horton Hornets. He played in the 2011 Super League Grand Final defeat by the Leeds Rhinos at Old Trafford. St Helens reached the 2014 Super League Grand Final, and Makinson was selected to play on the wing, scoring a try in their 14–6 victory over the Wigan Warriors at Old Trafford.

Makinson played in the 2019 Challenge Cup Final defeat by the Warrington Wolves at Wembley Stadium. He played in the 2019 Super League Grand Final victory over the Salford Red Devils at Old Trafford, slotting a stunning drop goal in the process.

On 16 August 2020, Makinson was charged by the RFL and was given a Grade F "other contrary behaviour", (the most serious grade on the disciplinary panel, which carries a minimum punishment of eight games' suspension) for an alleged low grab on Castleford Tigers Liam Watts, during which the incident was placed on report by referee Liam Moore. He appeared before a disciplinary hearing on 17 August 2020, to find out the length of his suspension. Makinson contested the decision of his grade; the tribunal accepted his challenge, and decided that due to his previous disciplinary record, his Grade was downgraded to a Grade E, and he was given a five-match suspension, and fined £500. He was unavailable for selection until early October.

Makinson played in the club's 8-4 2020 Super League Grand Final victory over Wigan at the Kingston Communications Stadium in Hull; his 80th minute drop-goal attempt rebounded off the goal sticks and led to the winning try. He played for St. Helens in their 2021 Challenge Cup Final victory over Castleford, scoring a try in a 26-12 triumph.

In round 19 of the 2021 Super League season, Makinson was sent off during St Helens' shock 20-10 loss against Castleford. He played for St Helens in their 2021 Super League Grand Final victory over Catalans Dragons; in the second half, he was sent to the sin bin and thus became the first player to be sin-binned in a Super League Grand Final. In round 23 of the 2022 Super League season, Makinson scored two tries and kicked eight goals in St Helens' 60-6 victory over Hull F.C. The following week in round 24, he scored two tries and kicked seven goals in St Helens' 38-12 victory over Hull Kingston Rovers. In the 2022 semi-final, Makinson was sent to the sin bin for a professional foul during St Helens' 19-12 victory over Salford which sent the club into their fourth consecutive grand final. On 24 September 2022, he played for St Helens in their 2022 Super League Grand Final victory over Leeds.
On 18 February 2023, Makinson played in St Helens 13-12 upset victory over Penrith in the 2023 World Club Challenge.

International career
Makinson enjoyed a stellar 2018 season, being included in the Super League Dream Team and playing a starring role in England's 2–1 series victory over New Zealand. This included a hat-trick in the second Test at Anfield. In November 2018 he won the Rugby League World Golden Boot Award over James Tedesco, Dallin Watene-Zelezniak and Elliot Whitehead.
On 15 October 2022, Makinson scored one try and kicked ten goals in England's opening game of the 2021 Rugby League World Cup against Samoa. England would win the match 60-6.
In the quarter final of the 2021 Rugby League World Cup, Makinson became the first player to score five tries for England in a game as they won 46-6 against Papua New Guinea.

References

External links

St Helens profile
SL profile
Saints Heritage Society profile
England profile

1991 births
Living people
England national rugby league team players
English rugby league players
Rochdale Hornets players
Rugby league fullbacks
Rugby league players from Wigan
Rugby league wingers
St Helens R.F.C. players
Whitehaven R.L.F.C. players